Robert Bache Smith ( June 4, 1875 – November 6, 1951), usually published as Robert B. Smith, was an American librettist and lyricist. His older brother, Harry B. Smith, was also a successful lyricist and a writer and composer.

Born in Chicago, Smith began his career apprenticing with the famed vaudeville duo Weber and Fields. He most notably wrote the lyrics to “Come Down, Ma Evenin' Star” from Weber and Fields' Twirly Whirly (1902; famously sung by Lillian Russell). He went on to write libretti for operettas and lyrics for musicals, including such works as Fantana (1905), The Spring Maid (1910), Sweethearts (1913), and Angel Face (1919). His last work was The Girl in the Spotlight (credited as Richard Bruce) in 1920. He died in New York City at the age of 76.

Selected productions
Twirly Whirly – musical, book written in 1902
Breaking Into Society – musical, book and lyrics written in 1902
The Spring Maid – musical, book and lyrics written in 1910
The Rose Maid – musical, lyrics written in 1912
The Girl from Montmartre – musical, lyrics written in 1913
Lilac Domino – Broadway adaptation, written in 1914
A Lonely Romeo – musical, lyrics written in 1919
Sweethearts – musical, lyrics written for 1929 revival (also 1947 revival)

References

External links

1875 births
1951 deaths
American musical theatre lyricists
American librettists
Musicians from Chicago